Todd Scott (born January 23, 1968) is a former American football player who played as a safety for four different NFL teams. He went to the Pro Bowl after the 1992 season with the Minnesota Vikings.

References

1968 births
Living people
American football safeties
Kansas City Chiefs players
Louisiana Ragin' Cajuns football players
Minnesota Vikings players
New York Jets players
Tampa Bay Buccaneers players
National Conference Pro Bowl players
Sportspeople from Galveston, Texas
Players of American football from Texas